Ragna Agerup (born 22 June 1995) is a Norwegian Olympic Sailor and a Junior World Champion. She represents the Royal Norwegian Yacht Club in Oslo and Brown University in Providence, RI.

49erFX Career 
Together with her twin sister Maia Agerup she sailed the Olympic Class boat 49erFX and competed in the 2016 Summer Olympics in Rio de Janeiro, Brazil. 

In June 2016 the team was ranked 15th on the ISAF 49erFX World Ranking. Their best ranking position is 4th, from December 2012. Best Olympic result is 12. (2016 Rio Olympics) 

After qualifying Norway for the 2020 Olympic Games in Tokyo through her 9th place in the 2018 World Championship in Aarhus, Denmark, she announced that she would prioritise finishing her undergraduate studies at Brown University in the US instead of starting a new Olympic campaign.

College Sailing Career 
Ragna was a starting skipper at the Brown University Sailing Team until her graduation in 2020. She sailed both on the Co-ed and Women's team. In 2019 she was selected ICSA Women’s College Sailor of the Year. In College, she was selected to the ICSA All American Sailing Team multiple times as a Skipper in both in the Women and Co-ed sailing classes. 

She has also sailed Optimist Dinghy and 29er.

Junior career

2010 - Gold. Norwegian Championship, Optimist

2010 - Gold. Norwegian Championship Teams Racing. (KNS - Maia Agerup, Line Flem Høst, Sophie Tjøm)

2013 - Gold. Norwegian Championship, 29er

2013 - 12th place and winner of the Female Class. 29er World Championship. Aarhus, Denmark

2013 - 4th place. 29er EuroCup Overall  (Best Female Team)

2015 - Bronze. U23 World Championship, 49erFX. Flensburg, Germany

2017 - Gold, U23 World Championship, 49erFX, Kingston, Canada

2019 - Gold, ICSA College Sailing National Championship, Newport, USA

Senior career

2014 - Gold. ISAF World Cup, 49erFX. Melbourne, Australia

2015 - 9th place. European Championship, 49erFX. Porto, Portugal

2016 - 4th place. ISAF World Cup, 49erFX. Miami, USA

2016 - 5th place. ISAF World Cup, 49erFX. Weymouth, United Kingdom

2016 - 12th place, 2016 Olympic Games, Rio de Janeiro, Brazil

2017 - 2nd place, World Sailing World Cup. Miami, USA

2017 - 7th place. European Championship, 49erFX. Kiel, Germany

2018 - 2nd place, World Sailing World Cup. Miami, USA

2018 - 7th place. European Championship, 49erFX. Sopot, Poland

2018 - 9th place. World Sailing World Championship, Aarhus, Denmark

References

 http://www.olympiatoppen.no/om_olympiatoppen/aktuelt/page8501.html
 https://members.sailing.org/sailors/biog.php?memberid=335341
 https://collegesailing.org/news/article/agerup-named-quantum-womens-sailor-of-the-year-and-womens-all-americans-nam

1995 births
Living people
Sportspeople from Oslo
Norwegian female sailors (sport)
Olympic sailors of Norway
Sailors at the 2016 Summer Olympics – 49er FX
Twin sportspeople
Norwegian twins
Norwegian sportswomen
ICSA Women’s College Sailor of the Year
Brown Bears sailors
21st-century Norwegian women